The Trinity Academy of Engineering is a technical education institute in the city of Pune, India.  The institute is affiliated with the University of Pune and managed by the KJ's Educational Institutes (KJEI). It has been accredited by the National Board of Accreditation and recognized by the All India Council for Technical Education (AICTE). The institute has also been awarded an "A" Grade by the National Assessment And Accreditation Council (NAAC) and Directorate of Technical Education, Maharashtra.

Campus
The college has about 200 faculty members, 67 laboratories, 1 central library and 100 administrative and support staff.

The campus has three major canteens, 4 coffee and snack outlets that remain open during the college hours, and an auditorium with ceiling fans.

The hostel is equipped with a mess facility for students and also has wifi. It is located in the campus.

Courses
The college offers the following graduate and postgraduate courses:
B.E. M.E.& MCA Degree courses:
  Civil Engineering (60 seats)
  Computer Engineering(60 seats)
  Electronics and Communication Engineering(60 seats)
  Mechanical Engineering (60seats)
 Information Technology (60seats)
 MCA (60seats)
 Construction management (24 seats)
 CAD-CAM (24 seats)

References

Engineering colleges in Pune
Educational institutions established in 2010
2010 establishments in Maharashtra
Colleges affiliated to Savitribai Phule Pune University